A Cidomo is a small horse-drawn carriage used in the Lesser Sunda Islands of Lombok and the Gili Islands of Indonesia.

Etymology
It is also known as benhur after similarities to the Roman carts in the film Ben-Hur and Lombok "Ferrari".

Description
The carriage is usually brightly colored and often has many tassels and bells and pneumatic tyres. The carriage usually seats up to four people, two people in the front and two in the back. In the Gili Islands is one of the most common forms of transport as motor vehicles are not allowed.

Problems
One problem of the cidomo is that they are very slow and are partly responsible for creating traffic congestion in the towns. Dung from the horses is also posing an environmental problem in the towns and cidomo drivers have been urged by the Indonesian government to clean up after themselves or face suspension. Many tourists are against the inhumane way the horses are treated, often having to work long hours on concrete floors, visible signs of dehydration and sometimes suffering beating from the riders.

References

Transport in Indonesia
Lesser Sunda Islands
Horse transportation